Marilyn Agrelo is an American film director and producer.

She directed and co-produced the 2005 documentary film Mad Hot Ballroom. The documentary won several awards, including the Satellite Award for Best Documentary Film in 2005 and the Christopher Award in 2006.

Her documentary Street Gang: How We Got to Sesame Street premiered at the 2021 Sundance Film Festival.

Selected filmography 

 2005: Mad Hot Ballroom
 2010: An Invisible Sign
 2021: Street Gang: How We Got to Sesame Street

References

External links 
 

Living people
Year of birth missing (living people)
Place of birth missing (living people)
American film directors
American film producers
American women film directors
American women film producers
21st-century American women